The African Cup of Champions Clubs 1972 was the 8th edition of the annual international club football competition held in the CAF region (Africa), the African Cup of Champions Clubs. It determined that year's club champion of association football in Africa.

The tournament was played by 26 teams and used a knock-out format with ties played home and away. Hafia FC from Guinea won the final, becoming CAF club champion for the first time and the first Guinean team to win the trophy.

First round

|}
1Al-Merrikh withdrew.
2Abaluhya United withdrew.

Second round

|}
1 After the match had finished 2-0 to Djoliba AC, leaving the aggregate level at 2–2, AS Forces Armées (Dakar) refused to take part in the penalty shootout to protest the officiating; they were ejected from the competition and banned from CAF competitions for three years.

Quarter-finals

|}

Semi-finals

|}
1 TP Mazembe refused to play the 2nd leg contesting the eligibility of the referees assigned by CAF: TP Mazembe were ejected from the competition, and CAF awarded Hafia FC a 2–0 victory.

Final

Champion

Top scorers
The top scorers from the 1972 African Cup of Champions Clubs are as follows:

External links
African Cup of Champions results at Rec.Sport.Soccer Statistics Foundation

1972 in African football
African Cup of Champions Clubs